In anatomy, a process is a projection or outgrowth of tissue from a larger body. For instance, in a vertebra, a process may serve for muscle attachment and leverage (as in the case of the transverse and spinous processes), or to fit (forming a synovial joint), with another vertebra (as in the case of the articular processes). The word is used even at the microanatomic level, where cells can have processes such as cilia or pedicels. Depending on the tissue, processes may also be called by other terms, such as apophysis, tubercle, or protuberance.

Examples
Examples of processes include:
The many processes of the human skull:
 The mastoid and styloid processes of the temporal bone
 The zygomatic process of the temporal bone
 The zygomatic process of the frontal bone
 The orbital, temporal, lateral, frontal, and maxillary processes of the zygomatic bone
 The anterior, middle, and posterior clinoid processes and the petrosal process of the sphenoid bone
 The uncinate process of the ethmoid bone
 The jugular process of the occipital bone
 The alveolar, frontal, zygomatic, and palatine processes of the maxilla
 The ethmoidal and maxillary processes of the inferior nasal concha
 The pyramidal, orbital, and sphenoidal processes of the palatine bone
 The coronoid and condyloid processes of the mandible
 The xiphoid process at the end of the sternum
The acromion and coracoid processes of the scapula
 The coronoid process of the ulna
 The radial and ulnar styloid processes
 The uncinate processes of ribs found in birds and reptiles
 The uncinate process of the pancreas
The spinous, articular, transverse, accessory, uncinate, and mammillary processes of the vertebrae
 The trochlear process of the heel
 The appendix, which is sometimes called the "vermiform process", notably in Gray's Anatomy
 The olecranon process of the ulna

See also
Eminence
Tubercle
Appendage
Pedicle of vertebral arch

Notes

References
 Dorland's Medical Dictionary

Anatomy